The Meg is a 2018 science fiction action film directed by Jon Turteltaub with screenplay by Dean Georgaris, Jon Hoeber, and Erich Hoeber, loosely based on the 1997 book Meg: A Novel of Deep Terror by Steve Alten. The film stars Jason Statham, Li Bingbing, Rainn Wilson, Ruby Rose, Winston Chao, and Cliff Curtis. A group of scientists encounters a  megalodon shark while on a rescue mission on the floor of the Pacific Ocean.

Walt Disney Studios originally purchased the film rights to the book in the 1990s but spent years in development hell. The rights eventually landed at Warner Bros. Pictures, and the film was green-lit in 2013. Turteltaub and much of the cast joined by September 2014, and filming began in New Zealand and Sanya, China, ending in January 2016. The film is an American and Chinese co-production. The Meg was released in both countries on August 10, 2018, in RealD 3D. It was a box office success and grossed over $530 million worldwide, despite receiving mixed reviews from critics.

A sequel, titled Meg 2: The Trench, is scheduled to be released on August 4, 2023.

Plot 

Rescue diver Jonas Taylor attempts to save the crew of a damaged nuclear submarine when he sees the hull being rammed by an unidentified creature. Two of his crew are trapped in the damaged sub, but Taylor is forced to flee, realizing that attempting rescue would result in the deaths of everyone he has already saved. His account of the story is dismissed by fellow survivor Dr. Heller, denouncing Taylor's actions as the result of pressure induced psychosis.

Five years later, billionaire Jack Morris meets Dr. Minway Zhang at an underwater research facility the former finances called Mana One. Zhang and his oceanographer daughter Suyin supervise a mission to explore what could be the deepest section of the Mariana Trench, concealed by a thermocline of hydrogen sulfide. The mission submersible is piloted by Lori, Taylor's ex-wife, scientists Toshi and "The Wall". They discover an abundance of never-before-seen flora and fauna below the thermocline, but an attack by a large, unidentified creature causes the submersible to lose contact with Mana One.

An old friend of Taylor's, Mana One operations manager James "Mac" Mackreides, suggests sending Taylor down to attempt a rescue. Despite the objections of Heller, now a member of the Mana One crew, Zhang and Mac venture to Thailand to recruit Taylor, now a drunken loner. He is initially skeptical but relents after listening to a taped recording containing the dialogue between Lori, her crew, and Mana One. Suyin attempts the rescue in their absence but is attacked by a giant squid. Before the squid can crush her submersible, it is killed by an enormous shark. Taylor, having agreed to help, breaches the thermocline and reaches the sunken submersible. When the shark returns and attacks the submersible before the evacuation has been completed, Toshi sacrifices himself to help the others escape.

Returning to Mana One, the crew discovers the giant shark is a megalodon, or "Meg". While discussing how to address it, Suyin's daughter Meiying witnesses the shark arriving at the station. The crew realizes that the meg followed them through a temporary break they caused in the thermocline and resolves to go out and track the Meg before killing it with poison. After the meg destroys three nearby shark fin fishing ships, Taylor enters the water to shoot the Meg with a tracker, and then the team puts Suyin in a shark-proof tank so she can shoot the Meg with poison. However, the mission goes awry when the shark attacks the cage and cracks Suyin's mask, causing her to lose oxygen. She manages to poison the shark just as Taylor manages to get her out of the cage. The Meg returns and attacks Taylor and Suyin, but it gets snagged on the cage's line and dies from the poison.

In their moment of triumph, a second, much larger Meg emerges, devouring The Wall and the dead Meg, critically wounding Zhang, and destroying the crew's ship. Heller sacrifices himself by distracting the Meg to save fellow crew member Jaxx. Mac swims out to a floating lifeboat so he and the crew can regroup at Mana One, though Zhang dies on the way. The shark gives chase, but it is deterred by a helicopter Morris called in. Back at the station, Morris claims that he has informed all the local governments about the Meg and that they will handle it while secretly enlisting a mercenary team to kill the shark with depth charges, but they accidentally kill a whale. Realizing the Meg is near, the team speeds away but Morris falls overboard and is eaten. The team soon learns of Morris's deceit and resolve to killing the Meg themselves.

The Meg attacks a crowded beach in Sanya Bay, China, and devours several beach-goers before the Mana One crew uses a whale call to divert its attention toward them. Taylor and Suyin board submersibles and work together to kill it, but Suyin is forced to break off to save the others when a helicopter crashing into their ship forces them into the water. Taylor wounds the beast with his damaged submersible and stabs it in the eye, spilling its blood and attracting a swarm of modern sharks that devour the dying Meg. Taylor reunites with the rest of the Mana One crew on a passing wedding boat and considers taking a vacation with Suyin and Meiying. Meanwhile, in the water a passing Meg is heard, suggesting that more than two escaped the trench.

Cast

Production

Development 
Disney's Hollywood Pictures initially acquired the rights to the novel in 1996. Around that time, Tom Wheeler was hired to adapt the book into a screenplay, but, having decided that his script was not good enough, the studio hired Jeffrey Boam to write a new draft. Boam's script was later rejected for the same reason. By 1999 the project had stalled, and the rights reverted to Steve Alten, the book's author.

In 2005, reports surfaced that the project was being developed by New Line Cinema, with an estimated budget of $75 million and a slated release of summer 2006. Names attached to the production included Jan de Bont as director, Guillermo del Toro as producer, and Shane Salerno as a screenwriter. However, New Line later canceled the project due to budgetary concerns. The rights reverted to Alten again, but the film remained in development hell.

In 2015, it was announced that the film was now moving forward at Warner Bros., with a new script written by Dean Georgaris. By June of that year, Eli Roth was reported to be in talks to direct, but due to creative differences, Roth was replaced by Jon Turteltaub in early 2016. Jason Statham and much of the cast joined in August and September 2016.

The film is an American and Chinese co-production. It was considered a full co-production under Chinese regulations, and it was not subject to the same quota system and revenue sharing agreements usually applied to imported films.

Filming 
Principal photography on the film began on October 13, 2016, in West Auckland, New Zealand. Filming ended on January 4, 2017, in Sanya City of Hainan, China.

Visual effects 
Visual effects were done by Sony Imageworks, Image Engine, and Scanline VFX. The visual effects team was challenged with designing a previously undiscovered prehistoric giant shark and designing the underwater environments and atmospherics, including realistic coral reefs, bubbles, and other sea life.

Music 
Harry Gregson-Williams's score was recorded at Synchron Stage in Vienna, Austria.

Release 
Released by Gravity Pictures in China and Warner Bros. Pictures in the United States, the film was initially scheduled to be released on March 2, 2018. Warner and Gravity then said that the film would be released during the 2018 Chinese New Year period in China, a week-long annual holiday on February 16, 2018. The film was later pushed back from its original release date of March 2, 2018, to August 10, 2018, in 3D and IMAX. The studio spent $140 million on global prints and advertisements for the film.

Home media 
The Meg was released for digital download on October 30, 2018, and on Ultra HD Blu-ray, Blu-ray, and DVD on November 13. As of August 2020, it is available to stream on Amazon Prime in the United Kingdom. It is also available on Amazon Prime in the United States.

Reception

Box office 
The Meg grossed $145.4 million in the United States and Canada and $384.8 million in other territories, for a total worldwide gross of $530.2 million, against a production budget between $130–178 million.

In the United States and Canada, was initially projected to gross $20–22 million from 4,119 theaters in its opening weekend. The film made $4 million from Thursday night previews, leading analysts to predict it would outperform its low $20 million projections. After making $16.5 million on its first day, weekend estimates were raised to $40 million. It went on to debut at $45.4 million, topping the box office and marking the best solo opening of Statham's career, as well as Turteltaub's. It made $21.5 million in its second weekend and $13 million in its third, finishing second behind Crazy Rich Asians both times.

The film debuted to $101.5 million from 96 countries in other territories, for a worldwide opening of $146.9 million. In China, a co-producer of the film grossed $50.3 million from 12,650 screens and ranked 3 in the opening weekend. Other top openings were Mexico ($6.2 million), Russia ($5 million), the United Kingdom ($4.4 million), Spain ($2.4 million), and the Philippines ($2 million).

Critical response 
The site's critics consensus reads: "The Meg sets audiences up for a good old-fashioned B-movie creature feature, but lacks the genre thrills—or the cheesy bite—to make it worth diving in." On Metacritic, the film has a weighted average score of 46 out of 100, based on 46 critics, indicating "mixed or average reviews". Audiences polled by CinemaScore gave the film an average grade of "B+" on an A+ to F scale.

Owen Gleiberman of Variety gave the film a mixed review, calling it "neither good enough—nor bad enough," and writing, "The Meg, a rote sci-fi horror adventure film that features a shark the size of a blue whale, comes on like it wants to be the mother of all deep-sea attack movies. But it's really just the mother of all generically pandering, totally unsurprising Jaws ripoffs." Scott Mendelson of Forbes was impressed by the film's special effects and called it "a polished B movie that delivers the goods." At the same time, IGN's William Bibbiani praised the performances of the cast, particularly Statham. Writing for The Hollywood Reporter, Simon Abrams said the film was "refreshingly unpretentious" and "a breath of fresh air" compared with the Sharknado series.

Accolades 

The film was nominated for a Golden Raspberry Award in Worst Prequel, Remake, Rip-off, or Sequel (as a ripoff of Jaws).

Sequel 

In April 2018, Jason Statham said a Meg sequel would happen if the film did well with the public saying, "I think it's like anything in this day and age—if it makes money, there's an appetite to make more money. And if it doesn't do well, they'll soon sweep it under the carpet. But that's the way Hollywood works." That August, Steve Alten said, "My feeling has always been that this is a billion-dollar franchise if it was done right. But to be done right, you had to get the shark right, get the cast right, get the tone right. And Warner Bros. has nailed it completely. The producers have nailed it."

In October 2018, executive producer Catherine Xujun Ying said a sequel was in the early stages of development. In March 2019, a script for the film was in the works. In his September 2020 newsletter, Steve Alten confirmed the script, titled Meg 2: The Trench, was complete, expressing interest in its "dark" tone and potential for an R-rating. British director Ben Wheatley will direct. In April 2021, Statham said that he believed that filming would begin in January 2022. Production officially began at Warner Bros. Studios in Leavesden in February 2022, with screenwriters Dean Georgaris, Erich Hoeber, and Jon Hoeber returning, and Statham and Li expected to reprise their roles from the first film. In March 2022, it was announced that the film will be released on August 4, 2023.

See also 
 Jaws
 Deep Blue Sea
 Mega Shark
 List of natural horror films

References

External links 

 
 
 
 

Meg series
2010s monster movies
2018 science fiction action films
2018 3D films
American action thriller films
American monster movies
American science fiction action films
Di Bonaventura Pictures films
2010s English-language films
Films about sharks
Films based on American thriller novels
Films based on science fiction novels
Films directed by Jon Turteltaub
Films produced by Gerald R. Molen
Films produced by Lorenzo di Bonaventura
Films scored by Harry Gregson-Williams
Films shot in Asia
Films shot in China
Films shot in Hainan
Films shot in New Zealand
Films shot in Shanghai
Films shot in Tokyo
Films set in the future
Films set in Asia
Films set in China
Films set in Hainan
Films set in Thailand
Films set in the Pacific Ocean
Films set in Shanghai
Films set in Tokyo
Flagship Entertainment films
Giant monster films
Fiction about government
Films about shark attacks
Science fiction submarine films
Underwater action films
Warner Bros. films
The Meg (franchise)
Films involved in plagiarism controversies
2010s American films